Kris Mampaey (born 2 November 1970) is a Belgian former professional footballer who played as a goalkeeper.

Career
Mampaey started his senior career with Lierse S.K. In 2000, he signed for Dunfermline Athletic in the Scottish Championship, where he made fifteen appearances. After that, he played for Belgian club Royal Antwerp, Dutchs clubs Den Bosch and AZ Alkmaar, and Belgian club K.R.C. Mechelen before retiring in 2005.

After football
Mampaey later worked as a maintenance engineer in his home country.

References

External links 
 Kris Mampaey (Dunfermline): "Ik droom van terugkeer naar België" 
 "Het was even schrikken"
 Football: Mampaey Sparks Pars Keeper Hunt 
 Kris Mampaey: 'Wij wonnen ook slechte duels' 
 Een 'Nederlandse' doelman uit België 
 "Willem II gaat voor de tweede ronde" 
 Nederland: Kris Mampaey out tot winterstop 
 Het Nieuwsblad Tag 
 Het Belang van Limburg Tag 
 Dutch Wikipedia Page 
 RAFC-Museum Profile

Living people
1970 births
Belgian footballers
Association football goalkeepers
Eredivisie players
Eerste Divisie players
Belgian Pro League players
Scottish Professional Football League players
Lierse S.K. players
Willem II (football club) players
Dunfermline Athletic F.C. players
Royal Antwerp F.C. players
FC Den Bosch players
AZ Alkmaar players
K.R.C. Mechelen players
Belgian expatriate footballers
Belgian expatriate sportspeople in the Netherlands
Expatriate footballers in the Netherlands
Belgian expatriate sportspeople in Scotland
Expatriate footballers in Scotland